Snow River Mountain Resort is located in the Upper Peninsula of Michigan in Wakefield Township, Gogebic County. Indianhead Mountain is in an area called "Big Snow Country", so named because of the annual  average snowfall, courtesy of the lake effect from Lake Superior. It consists of the Jackson Creek Summit, formerly Indianhead Mountain, and Black River Basin, formerly known as Blackjack.

History 
The roots of Jackson Creek Summit tie in closely with the past and current economy of the area. In the late 1950s, Jack English, an amateur pilot from Chicago, flew over Indianhead Mountain. After seeing the abundant snow and area conditions, he developed "Indianhead Mountain Resort". This was the impetus for the local ski industry—in the following years, other resorts opened and the area became a skiing hotspot. English is credited with creating the ski industry in the area, and shifting the local economy away from the failing iron mines to one of the most popular ski destinations in the country. An indication of how important skiing has become to the region is Gogebic Community College's ski area management program, one of the few in the country.

In 2008, Indianhead announced they were acquiring nearby BlackJack Mountain and Big Powderhorn Mountain. although Big Powderhorn was spun off to a new owner at the end of 2009. During the summer of 2016, the parent company of the two resorts renamed itself to be "Big Snow Resorts".

During the spring of 2022, it was announced that Midwestern Family Ski Resorts had acquired Big Snow. The family owned company also owns Lutsen Mountains in Minnesota and Granite Peak Ski Area in Wisconsin, which are the largest mountains in each of their states. He also announced that both of the mountains would undergo rebranding, and close snowmobile trail 2. In 2022, it was announced that "Indianhead Mountain" and "Blackjack Resort" would be respectively rechristened to "Jackson Creek Summit" and "Black River Basin" for the start of the 2022 season.

Winter activities 
The area offers snowshoeing, ice skating, cross-country skiing and other winter activities. The area is best known for downhill alpine skiing. Jackson Creek Summit itself only offers downhill alpine skiing.

Skiing

Jackson Creek Summit 
Jackson Creek Summit features runs from very easy greens through double diamond. Over 95% of the hill is groomed, and although there is no official tree skiing, adventurous skiers manage it anyway. There are 10 Beginner Green runs (the largest, Voyagers Highway is in itself the size of many Midwest ski areas), seven More Difficult Blue runs, seven Most difficult Black runs, and four Expert Double Diamond runs primarily because of moguls.

The facilities normally found at the hill base are on top of the hill at Jackson Creek. This means that all skiing begins at the hill top, so your last lift ride for the day is up and off the hill. There are no accommodations at the base of the hill, but there are numerous trailside condos, hill top condos, and rental cabins in the area.

Jackson Creek is considered to be a family friendly ski area. Youngsters under age nine years ski free with a paid adult.

Amenities include the typical bars, snack areas and restaurant at the top of the hill, and a large restaurant / snack area at the base of the hill. There's also a ski shop, ski and board rentals, and lockers throughout the lodge.

The mountain is serviced by three double chairlifts, one quad lift, one triple lift, one Poma lift, two T-bar lifts and a towrope. The T-bar lifts are at the base of some Expert runs.

The hill also offers NASTAR racing and has a ski school with private and group lessons. The NASTAR run has permanent course start and end structures for registration, start, timing, etc. on Sundance.

Black River Basin 
Black River Basin has 22 downhill runs across 126 skiable acres. The runs are 20% Beginner, 40% Intermediate and 40% Expert, with one double black diamond expert trail. The area is unusual in that has three terrain parks and two glade trails allowing tree skiing for both adults and children.

Summer activities

Hiking 
The mountain is popular in the summer months with many hiking clubs and groups. Many clubs consider it a difficult, albeit enjoyable hike.

Wildlife 
In May, the slopes become home to herds of Whitetail deer.

Waterfalls 
The mountain is near the Black River, which provides access to some of the most well known waterfalls in the Western U.P.

Events

Amsoil Championship Snocross 2013 
Blackjack Mountain hosted one of the 2013 Amsoil Championship SnoCross Races this race occurred from 12/6/13 to 12/7/13 and the race was named Northern Clearing SnoCross.

Snocross is the most exciting, fan friendly form of snowmobile racing. It combines the big-air jumps and exciting action of motocross with the crisp winter environment, providing snowbelt race fans with race action, world class athletes to cheer, and fun, family venues to visit. The action happens during a time of year and in geographic locations where it’s the premier race event of the season, on challenging, professionally designed and graded tracks.

Fall colors 
The views from the top of Jackson Creek Summit provide some of the best views of the Fall Colors. People travel from all over the world to see the varieties of Maple, Oak and other hardwoods change color. Jackson Creek Summit is on one of the many Fall Color Routes.

Location 

Photographs

References

External links 

 Snowriver Resorts website
 Resort Guide
 Cross Country Skiing
 Dept. of Tourism site
 A local business has a great review of area recreations and attractions.
 Information about Indianhead and Surrounding Area

Tourist attractions in Gogebic County, Michigan
Ski areas and resorts in Michigan
Sports venues in Michigan
Buildings and structures in Gogebic County, Michigan
Geography of Gogebic County, Michigan